Sir Ralph Windham (25 March 1905 – 6 July 1980) was a British lawyer who held various positions in the Colonial Legal Service.
He was a judge in Palestine, Ceylon, Kenya, Zanzibar and Tanganyika.
While trying a case in Tel Aviv in January 1947 he was kidnapped from the courtroom by Jewish terrorists, but was released the next day.

Early years

Ralph Windham was born on 25 March 1905, son of Ashe Windham and Cora Ellen Sowerby Middleton.
His family had owned property in Wawne township, Yorkshire, since 1651.
His grandfather, also Ashe Windham (died 1909) had served in the colonial judiciary in Africa.
Ralph Windham attended Wellington College, Berkshire, and then Trinity College, Cambridge, graduating in 1928 with a Bachelor of Laws degree.
He continued his studies at Trinity, and in 1930 graduated with a Master of Arts and won the Buchanan Prize for Students for Lincolns Inn.
That year he was admitted to Lincoln's Inn as a barrister.

Career

Palestine (1945–1947)

On 3 July 1935, Windham was appointed a member of the Legal Board of Palestine by O. C. K. Corrie, Acting Chief Justice of Palestine.
Windham held the office of Judge of the District Court of Palestine in 1942.
On 27 January 1947, Jewish extremists kidnapped Windham from the Tel Aviv District courtroom.
The armed men snatched Windham while still wearing his judge's robe and wig.
The kidnapping seemed to be linked to the impending execution of Dov Gruner, a member of the Irgun. 
High Commissioner Sir Alan Cunningham told Jewish leaders that if Windham and another hostage were not quickly freed he would impose martial law on parts of the country.

Later that day an application for leave to appeal Dov Gruner's sentence to the Privy Council was granted.
In the parliamentary debate the next day Mr. Winston Churchill demanded assurance that Gruner's death sentence had not been respited on account of the hostages taken by the Jewish terrorists."
Windham was released that night. He said he had not been mistreated, but the kidnappers had kept his wig as a souvenir.
In July 1977, Windham told the story of his kidnapping in a Thames Television interview.

Ceylon (1948–1951)

In 1948, Ralph Windham was appointed a puisne judge of the Supreme Court of Ceylon by the sovereign on the recommendations of the Colonial Secretary, the last judge to be appointed in this way.
British Ceylon became independent as Sri Lanka on 4 February 1948, but Justice Ralph Windham continued to serve until 1951.

East Africa (1951–1965)

On 10 April 1951, Ralph Windham, puisne judge, was appointed to exercise jurisdiction in divorce cases in Kenya.
On 25 July 1955, Ralph Williams, puisne judge, Kenya, was appointed Chief Justice of Zanzibar.
Ralph Windham, Chief Justice, Zanzibar, was appointed a Justice of Appeal at the Court of Appeal for Eastern Africa as of 6 January 1959.
In May 1959, the Queen gave permission for Ralph Windham, lately Chief Justice, Zanzibar, to wear the insignia of the second class of the Order of the Brilliant Star of Zanzibar, which had been conferred by the Sultan of Zanzibar.

In May 1960, Ralph Windham, Justice the Court of Appeal for Eastern Africa, was appointed Chief Justice of Tanganyika.
In June 1960, it was announced that Ralph Windham, Justice of Appeal, HM Court of Appeal for Eastern Africa, had been appointed Knight Bachelor in the Birthday Honours List.
Dick Eberlie, his ADC at this time, described him as "a quiet and gentle man", committed to maintaining the rule of law.
Sir Ralph acted as Governor-General whenever Richard Turnbull had to leave the country.
He remained Chief Justice after Tanganyika became independent on 9 December 1961, holding office until 1965.

Family

Windham married Kathleen Mary FitzHerbert, daughter of Captain Cecil Henry FitzHerbert and Ellen Katharine Lowndes, on 11 September 1946.
They had four children, John Jeremy (b. 1948), Andrew Guy (b. 1949), Penelope Susan (b. 1952) and Belinda Mary Victoria (b. 1955).
Ralph Windham died on 6 July 1980 at age 75.

Publications

Notes

Citations

Sources

 

1905 births
1980 deaths
Tanganyika (territory) judges
Puisne Justices of the Supreme Court of Sri Lanka
People from British Ceylon
Colonial Legal Service officers